"Why Ya Wanna" is a song recorded by American actress and country music artist Jana Kramer. It was released in January 2012 as the first single from her self-titled debut album, which was released on June 5. Three years later the song appeared as a bonus track on the Target Exclusive of her second studio album, Thirty One. The song was written by Ashley Gorley, Catt Gravitt and Chris DeStefano.

Content
"Why Ya Wanna" is a mid-tempo song in which the female narrator encounters an ex-lover, and asks him why he "want[s] to make [her] keep loving" him. The song is in 3/4 time signature and the key of E major.

Critical reception
Billy Dukes of Taste of Country gave the song two and a half stars out of five, writing that it "packs a surprising emotional punch, but it's weakened away by a grating melody." Bobby Peacock of Roughstock gave the song four stars out of five, calling it "a convincing, catchy slice of neo-trad that sounds as much 1992 as 2012."

Music video
The music video was directed by Kristin Barlowe and premiered in February 2012.

Chart performance
"Why Ya Wanna" debuted at number 60 on the U.S. Billboard Hot Country Songs chart for the week of December 10, 2011.

Charts and certifications

Weekly charts

Certifications

Year-end charts

References

2012 debut singles
2012 songs
Jana Kramer songs
Elektra Records singles
Songs written by Ashley Gorley
Songs written by Catt Gravitt
Song recordings produced by Scott Hendricks
Songs written by Chris DeStefano